Big Red Mike (foaled 2007 in Ontario) is a Canadian Thoroughbred racehorse who won the 2010 Queen's Plate, Canada's most prestigious race and North America's oldest annually run stakes race. He was bred by Dom Romeo's Terra Farms and raced by his nom de course, Terra Racing Stable.

Trained by Nick Gonzalez, leading up to the 151st edition of the Queen's Plate, Big Red Mike won the Plate Trial Stakes on June 13.

References
 Big Red Mike's pedigree and partial racing stats

2007 racehorse births
Racehorses bred in Canada
Racehorses trained in Canada
King's Plate winners
Thoroughbred family 3-f